Senator Madsen may refer to:

Charles D. Madsen (1906–1975), Wisconsin State Senate
Mark B. Madsen (born 1963), Utah State Senate